KNOT (1450 AM) is a radio station licensed to Prescott, Arizona. Its signal is relayed on FM translators K280GH (103.9) Prescott, Arizona and K300CI (107.9) Flagstaff, Arizona. In October 2015 KNOT changed their format from oldies to Contemporary Christian music, branded as "Arizona Shine".

References

External links

NOT
Prescott, Arizona
Radio stations established in 1957
NOT